Cudjoe may refer to:

 Cudjoe (c. 1680–1744), Jamaican Maroon leader
 Cudjoe (name)
 Cudjoe Key, Florida, unincorporated community in Monroe County, Florida
 Cudjoe Key Air Force Station, Formerly Used Defense Site